"To the Ends of the Earth" is a 1956 Nat King Cole song, written by Noel Sherman and Joe Sherman. It was released as a single in 1956 and reached number 25 on the pop charts. The song was reissued on the album This Is Nat King Cole (1957), and again on The Nat King Cole Story (1961).

Versions
The song was covered by Marvin Gaye on his album A Tribute to the Great Nat "King" Cole (1965), Tony Middleton (1966), and Engelbert Humperdinck on his 1967 album The Last Waltz and by Johnny Mathis on Mathis Magic (1979), again with Cole's daughter Natalie Cole on Mathis' Unforgettable – A Musical Tribute to Nat King Cole (1983), and others including Cole's younger brother Freddy Cole.

References

1956 singles
1956 songs
1950s ballads
Nat King Cole songs
Johnny Mathis songs
Marvin Gaye songs
Songs with lyrics by Noel Sherman
Songs written by Joe Sherman (songwriter)
Capitol Records singles